Soběslavice is a municipality and village in Liberec District in the Liberec Region of the Czech Republic. It has about 200 inhabitants.

Administrative parts
The village of Padařovice is an administrative part of Soběslavice.

Geography
It lies in the Jičín Uplands.

History
The first written mention of Soběslavice is from 1536.

References

External links

Villages in Liberec District